The Prony equation (named after Gaspard de Prony) is a historically important equation in hydraulics, used to calculate the head loss due to friction within a given run of pipe.  It is an empirical equation developed by Frenchman Gaspard de Prony in the 19th century:

where hf is the head loss due to friction, calculated from: the ratio of the length to diameter of the pipe L/D, the velocity of the flow V, and two empirical factors a and b to account for friction.

This equation has been supplanted in modern hydraulics by the Darcy–Weisbach equation, which used it as a starting point.

References
. The Prony equation and its replacement by the Darcy–Weisbach equation are on pp. 11–12.

Equations of fluid dynamics